Bắc Hà may refer to:

Đàng Ngoài, an area in northern Vietnam during the 17th and 18th centuries
Bắc Hà District, a rural district of Lào Cai Province
Bắc Hà, Hà Tĩnh, a ward of Hà Tĩnh city
Bắc Hà (township), a township and capital of Bắc Hà District
Bac Ha International University